Sunshine State Arch is a national historic site located at the intersection between NW 13th Ave. and NW 167th St., at the entrance to the Sunshine State Industrial Park (Sunshine State International Park, Inc.) in Miami Gardens, Miami-Dade County, Florida, USA. It was inspired by the monumental Gateway Arch in St. Louis. The Sunshine State Arch was finished in 1964, three years before the Gateway Arch. It was designed by Walter C. Harry.

It was added to the National Register of Historic Places in 2014.

References

National Register of Historic Places in Miami-Dade County, Florida
Miami Gardens, Florida
Buildings and structures completed in 1964
Tourist attractions in Miami